Jakub Pokorný (born 11 September 1996) is a Czech professional footballer who plays as a defender for Sigma Olomouc in the Czech First League.

Club career 
He started his professional career at Znojmo. He made his senior league debut for them on 28 September 2014 in their Czech National Football League 4–1 loss at Varnsdorf. He scored his first league goal on 27 March 2016 in Znojmo's Czech National Football League 3–1 loss at Hradec Králové. He moved to Baník Ostrava in 2016 and won promotion to the Czech First League with them the same season. On 30 August 2022, Pokorný joined Sigma Olomouc on a three-year contract.

International career 
He represented the Czech Republic in the Under-20 and Under-21 youth categories.

References

External links 
 
 Jakub Pokorný official international statistics
 
 Jakub Pokorný profile on the FC Baník Ostrava official website

1996 births
Living people
People from Znojmo
Czech footballers
Czech Republic youth international footballers
Czech National Football League players
Czech First League players
FC Baník Ostrava players
1. SC Znojmo players
Association football defenders
FK Ústí nad Labem players
FC Hradec Králové players
Czech Republic under-21 international footballers
Sportspeople from the South Moravian Region
SK Sigma Olomouc players